Jay Greenberg may refer to:

Jay Greenberg (composer) (born 1991), American composer
Jay Greenberg (psychoanalyst) (born 1942), American psychoanalyst and psychologist
Jay Greenberg (journalist), American sports journalist